Joint Stock Company Transneft is a state-controlled pipeline transport company headquartered in Moscow, Russia. It is the largest oil pipeline company in the world. The company is led by Nikolay Tokarev.

History

Transneft was established by the Government of the Russian Federation on 14 August 1993 and it was registered by the Moscow Registration Chamber on 26 August 1993.

Semyon Vainshtok headed Transneft from 13 September 1999 to 11 September 2007.

In 2008, Transnefteproduct, a company transporting refined oil products, was merged into Transneft.

In 2018, Transneft took over 31% of shares which belonged to the Russian Federation in Caspian Pipeline Consortium.

Operations

Accusations
Documents submitted by Transneft to the Russian Audit Chamber in 2008 were found at the disposal of Alexey Navalny, a minority shareholder of Transneft. The papers, published on 16 November 2010, contain information regarding multiple economic crimes committed by Transeft employees including Semyon Vainshtok, its daughter structures and contractors in the construction of the Eastern Siberia – Pacific Ocean oil pipeline. The documents described Transneft executives' setting up a series of shell companies to pose as contractors for Transneft's pipeline project. Navalny posted an audit indicating that the contracting fraud had cost Transneft US$4 billion. Both Transneft and the government auditing office, whose documents Navalny said he leaked on his site, denied the corruption claim. Prime Minister Vladimir Putin called for an investigation into the allegations. All facts of theft and fraud were confirmed by the company management. The reports that recorded the breaches were endorsed by the officials.

Transneft has been repeatedly criticized for the lack of transparency regarding its expenditures on charity. From 2007 to 2011, the company did not disclose information on recipients of these funds. In 2011, Transneft officially published information about its charity expenditures. It turned out that from January to  2011, the company spent on charity 3,21 billion rubles. However, only 52 million rubles were used to support several charity institutions, and 2,55 billion rubles were transferred to the Konstantinovsky charity foundation (its chair was Vladimir Kozhin, a former head the Directorate of the President of the Russian Federation).

Sanctions

On February 24, 2022, in response to Russia's military operations in Ukraine, several countries moved to impose more economic sanctions in addition to those in response to the 2021-2022 Russo-Ukrainian crisis. US President Joe Biden announced sanctions against several Russian individuals, companies, and financial institutions, including Transneft.

In March 2022, as a result of the 2022 Russian invasion of Ukraine the EU imposed sanctions on Transneft.

See also

Energy policy of Russia
Russia-Belarus energy dispute

Notes

References

External links

Official website in English
Transneft news
Transneft press releases
Publications about Transneft
A Transneft JSC Shareholder Intends to Bring the Company Management to Criminal Liability

 
Russian companies established in 1992
Companies based in Moscow
Non-renewable resource companies established in 1992
Companies listed on the Moscow Exchange
Government-owned companies of Russia
Oil companies of Russia
Oil pipeline companies
Russian brands
Russian entities subject to the U.S. Department of the Treasury sanctions
Energy companies established in 1992